Regina Maria Cordeiro Dunlop (born July 9, 1950) is a Brazilian Ambassador. In 2016 she left Geneva where she had been the Permanent Representative at the United Nations to be Brazil's ambassador in The Hague

Life
Dunlop was born in Rio de Janeiro in 1950. She joined the diplomatic service as a graduate in 1982.

In 2009 she was appointed to be the Alternate Permanent Representative on Brazil at the United Nations in New York. In 2013 she went to Geneva where she became the Permanent Representative at the United Nations. She was succeeded on 14 September 2016 by Maria Nazareth Farani Azevêdo. Dunlop became Brazil's ambassador in The Hague.

References

1950 births
Living people
People from Rio de Janeiro (city)
Brazilian diplomats
Permanent Representatives of Brazil to the United Nations
Brazilian women diplomats